The 1924 Illinois lieutenant gubernatorial election was held on November 2, 1924. Incumbent Republican Lieutenant Governor Fred E. Sterling won a landslide reelection.

Primary elections
Primary elections were held on April 8, 1924.

Democratic primary

Candidates
Michael H. Cleary, former State Senator and Democratic nominee for Illinois's at-large congressional district in 1918
Mark M. Duffy
Ferdinand A. Garesche, State Representative

Results

Republican primary

Candidates
Charles F. Kramp
Lewis Rinaker, former State Representative
Fred E. Sterling, incumbent Lieutenant Governor

Results

Socialist primary

Candidates
Tilden Bozarth, delegate to the 1924 Socialist Party National Convention

Results

General election

Candidates

Major candidates
Ferdinand A. Garesche, Democratic
Fred E. Sterling, Republican

Minor candidates
Tilden Bozarth, Socialist
Gustave A. Jennings, Socialist Labor, nominee for Governor in 1908 and for Lieutenant Governor in 1916
John Watt, Workers
John B. McElroy, Independent Republican
John B. Reilly, Commonwealth Land

Results

See also
1924 Illinois gubernatorial election

References

Bibliography

1924
Lieutenant gubernatorial
Illinois
November 1924 events